Joaquín Lorenzo Villanueva (1757–1837) was a Spanish priest, historian and writer. He was educated at the University of Valencia, and became a prominent historian of the Church. He was appointed court preacher at Madrid and confessor at the royal chapel. In 1823 he moved to Ireland, where ten years later he published Phoenician Ireland, an attempt to prove an ancient Phoenician colonization of the country. The work was translated into English in 1837 by Henry O'Brien.

References

 Biography: or, Third division of "The English encyclopedia", Volume 6, Bradbury, Evans & Co., 1868.
 The Universal Dictionary of Biography and Mythology, Vol. IV. 1887.

18th-century Spanish Roman Catholic priests
Spanish male writers
19th-century Spanish historians
Writers from the Valencian Community
18th-century Latin-language writers
19th-century Latin-language writers
Members of the Royal Spanish Academy
Politicians from the Valencian Community
1757 births
1837 deaths
Spanish emigrants to the United Kingdom
18th-century Spanish historians